Ramon Armendariz (born September 8, 1972) is an American former Major League Baseball umpire.

Career
Armendariz graduated from the Harry Wendelstedt Professional Baseball Umpire School in 1995. From 1995 through the 1998 season, Armendariz umpired in Rookie League and Class A minor league baseball. In 1999, he was promoted to the AA Texas League. The following year he advanced to the AAA Pacific Coast League, where he umpired through 2007. He spent 2008 and 2009 in the Chinese Professional Baseball League.

Outside of the regular season, Armendariz worked in the MLB Arizona Fall League from 2000 to 2004. He also umpired in the 2006 World Baseball Classic and completed three stints in Latin American winter baseball leagues.

Notable games
As a reserve umpire in 2004, Armendariz worked at first base for Greg Maddux's 299th career win on July 27.

On February 14, 2020, Armendariz's decision to eject University of Michigan designated hitter Jimmy Obertop for touching his bat to the ground was met with widespread criticism.

Return from China
Armendariz is currently the junior varsity baseball coach for Santa Monica High School. He umpires college baseball in the Western Athletic Conference and in the Pac-12 Conference.

See also 

 List of Major League Baseball umpires

References

1972 births
Living people
Major League Baseball umpires
Sportspeople from Los Angeles
Baseball people from California